N-tert-Butylbenzenesulfinimidoyl chloride is a useful oxidant for organic synthesis reactions. It is a good electrophile, and the sulfimide S=N bond can be attacked by nucleophiles, such as alkoxides, enolates, and amide ions. The nitrogen atom in the resulting intermediate is basic, and can abstract an α-hydrogen to create a new double bond.

Preparation 
This reagent can be synthesized quickly and in near-quantitative yield by reacting phenyl thioacetate with tert-butyldichloroamine in hot benzene. After the reaction is complete, the product can be isolated as a yellow, moisture-sensitive solid by vacuum distillation.

Mechanism 
The first two steps in an oxidation reaction involving N-tert-butylbenzenesulfinimidoyl chloride are similar to a nucleophilic acyl substitution reaction. A nucleophile, such as an alkoxide (1), attacks the S=N bond in 2. The resulting intermediate (3) collapses and ejects chloride ion, which is a good leaving group. The resulting sulfimide has two resonance forms - 4a and 4b. Because of this, the nitrogen is basic, and via a five-membered ring transition state, it can abstract the hydrogen adjacent to the oxygen. This forms a new C=O bond and ejects a neutral sulfenamide (5), giving ketone 6 as the product. N-tert-Butylbenzenesulfinimidoyl chloride reacts with enolates, amides, and primary alkoxides by the same general mechanism.

The Swern oxidation, which converts primary and secondary alcohols to aldehydes and ketones, respectively, also uses a sulfur-containing compound (DMSO) as the oxidant and proceeds by a similar mechanism. In the Swern oxidation, elimination also occurs via a five-membered ring transition state, but the basic species is a sulfur ylide instead of a negatively charged nitrogen. Several other oxidation reactions also make use of DMSO as the oxidant and pass through a similar transition state (see #See also).

Reactions 
Reacting an aldehyde with a Grignard reagent or organolithium and treating the resulting secondary alkoxide with N-tert-butylbenzenesulfinimidoyl chloride is a convenient one-pot reaction for converting aldehydes to ketones. While Grignards can be used for this reaction, organolithium compounds give higher yields, due to the higher reactivity of a lithium alkoxide compared to the corresponding magnesium salt. In some cases, an equivalent of DMPU, a Lewis base, will increase yields. For example, treating benzaldehyde with n-butyllithium and N-tert-butylbenzenesulfinimidoyl chloride in THF gives 1-phenyl-1-pentanone in good yield.

N-tert-Butylbenzenesulfinimidoyl chloride can also be used to synthesize imines from amines. Imines synthesized in this fashion have been shown to undergo a one-pot Mannich reaction with 1,3-dicarbonyl compounds, such as malonate esters and 1,3-diketones. In this example, Cbz-protected benzylamine is deprotonated using n-butyllithium, then treated with N-tert-butylbenzenesulfinimidoyl chloride to form the protected imine. Dimethyl malonate acts as the nucleophile and reacts with the imine to give the final product, a Mannich base.

See also 
 Swern oxidation
 Pfitzner–Moffatt oxidation
 Corey–Kim oxidation
 Parikh–Doering oxidation

References

External links 
  N-tert-butylbenzenesulfinimidoyl chloride on Organic Chemistry Portal

Reagents for organic chemistry
Organochlorides
Tert-butyl compounds